The Dalian dialect (Romaji: Dairen-ben) is a dialect of Mandarin Chinese spoken on the Liaodong Peninsula, China including the city of Dalian and parts of Dandong and Yingkou. The Dalian dialect shares many similarities with the Yantai dialect and Weihai dialect spoken on Shandong Peninsula (Jiaodong Peninsula), to the south of the Bohai Strait; hence each of them is a subset of Jiao Liao Mandarin. The Dalian dialect is notable among Chinese dialects for loanwords from Japanese and Russian, reflecting its history of foreign occupation.

Voice

Comparing with Mandarin on pronunciation

Syllables that don't exist in standard Mandarin 
biǎng (de) (It is actually the liaison of bì(婢) yăng(养), almost always followed by an unvoiced de(的)) -【Adjective】: literally means "raised by a maidservant";【Noun】a highly derogatory term to express despise or anger toward certain individual(s).
piǎ (This Chinese character is not made out yet.) -【Verb】to ridicule sb.

Consonants

Basic consonants

Vowels

Basic vowels

Compound vowels 

 Dark red color means compound vowels; ai, ei, ao, ou, an, en, in, ün, ang, ong, eng, ing are as basic vowels.
  are apical vowels of zi, ci, si.
 m, n and ng are nasal vowels of independent syllables; there are also two syllables of "hm 噷" and "hng 哼".

Erizational vowels 

 "瓦兒" and "碗兒" are different; "歌兒" and "根兒" are different, vowel of "根兒" is a kind of retroflex mid-central vowel.
 i of "zi, ci, si" is an apical vowel. After erizing, i turns into er, such as "事兒"ser4.
 The rule of i, u, ü combining with the erizational vowels is the same as the rule of those combining with the basic vowels, so the tabulation of this part is omitted.

Tones 

In Dalianian,
When Tone No.1 meets another Tone No.1 or Tone No.4 meets Tone No.1, usually the previous tone turns to Tone No.5 and the next tone doesn't change, like “家家戶戶”jia'r5-jia'r1-hur6-hur4, “駕崩”jia5-beng1.
When Tone No.1 meets Tone No.4, usually the previous tone doesn't change and the next tone turns to Tone No.6, like “蟋蟀”xi1-suai6 or xi3-suar, “稀碎”xi1-sei6.
When Tone No.4 meets another Tone No.4, usually the previous tone turns to Tone No.5 and the next tone turns to Tone No.6, like “畢恭畢敬”bi5-gongr1-bi5-jingr6, “客客氣氣”ke'r4-ke'r-qi5-qi6.
Tone No.5 and Tone No.6 are not basic tones, but modulations.

Vocabulary

Grammar 
According to the predicate structure analysis method of the British linguists Ricci, the Dalian dialect is the same as English and Mandarin - the sentence is generally composed of S+V+O, that is subject + predicate + object of the order, but there are special circumstances, such as the older generation of Dalian people will say "Jiǎ zóu ba! Jiǎ zóu ba! (家走吧!家走吧!)" instead of "Húi jiā ba! Húi jiā ba! (回家吧!回家吧!)". At this time, the sentence is not S+V+O, but S+O+V, that is, subject + object + predicate.
jiā means "home".
zǒu means "go".
húi means "go back to".
ba means a kind of mood which means "to persuade" or "to urge".

Others

Classification 
 The dialect of Zhongshan District, Xigang District, Shahekou District, Ganjingzi District, Lüshunkou District and Wafangdian City of Dalian belongs to Da-Wa Subarea;
 The dialect of Jinzhou District, Pulandian District, Zhuanghe City and Changhai County of Dalian belongs to Chang-Zhuang Subarea.

Distribution 
 Peninsulas: Shandong Peninsula, Liaodong Peninsula.
 Borders: Yalu River, Ussuri River.

References 

Dalian
Mandarin Chinese
Dialects by location